Anna Kistanova (born 26 August 1990) is a Kazakhstani biathlete. She competed in the 2014/15 World Cup season, and represented Kazakhstan at the Biathlon World Championships 2015 in Kontiolahti.

References

1990 births
Living people
Kazakhstani female biathletes
Asian Games medalists in biathlon
Asian Games silver medalists for Kazakhstan
Biathletes at the 2017 Asian Winter Games
Medalists at the 2017 Asian Winter Games
Universiade medalists in biathlon
Universiade silver medalists for Kazakhstan
Competitors at the 2015 Winter Universiade
21st-century Kazakhstani women